Yurii Mykhailovych Khmelnytskyi was a Ukrainian colonel of Sosnytsia Regiment during Cossack Hetmanate in 1648-1649.

Yurii Khmelnytsky, brother of hetman Bohdan Khmelnytsky was a colonel of Sosnytsia Regiment in 1648 and until it was dissolved in 1649. While Bohdan was continuing his campaign toward Warsaw, Yurii was ordered to remain in Sosnytsia and neighboring cities of Novhorod-Siverskyi, Starodub and Pochep. His regiment was to guard grain and to scout for enemy forces. In the cossack register of 1649, he is listed in Chernihiv Regiment, not holding any rank. His name was also given as Yusko, Iosko.

References

Sources

Colonels of the Cossack Hetmanate